Chengqu (literally "urban area" or "urban district") may refer to the following locations in the People's Republic of China:

Districts 
Chengqu, Shanwei, Guangdong
Chengqu, Jincheng, Shanxi
Chengqu, Yangquan, Shanxi

Subdistricts 
Chengqu Subdistrict, Jingning County, Gansu
Chengqu Subdistrict, Laoting County, Hebei
Chengqu Subdistrict, Yuanshi County, Hebei
Chengqu Subdistrict, Ning'an, Heilongjiang
Chengqu Subdistrict, Fuxin County, Fuxin Mongol Autonomous County, Liaoning
Chengqu Subdistrict, Lingwu, Ningxia
Chengqu Subdistrict, Rushan, Shandong
Chengqu Subdistrict, Hejin, Shanxi
Chengqu Subdistrict, Lop County, Hotan Prefecture, Xinjiang
Chengqu Subdistrict, Gejiu, Yunnan